Listennn... the Album is the debut album by American hip hop artist DJ Khaled. It was released on June 6, 2006. by Terror Squad Entertainment and Koch Records. The album features guest appearances from Young Jeezy, Bun B, Birdman, Juelz Santana, Slim Thug, Krayzie Bone, Chamillionaire, Trina, Twista, Freeway, Jadakiss, Beanie Sigel, Styles P and Lil Scrappy, among others. Reviews for the record were generally positive but divided over the production, lyrical content and Khaled as an artist. Listennn... the Album debuted at number 12 on the Billboard 200, selling 44,000 copies in its first week in the United States. The album was supported by three singles: "Holla at Me" featuring Lil Wayne, Paul Wall, Fat Joe, Rick Ross and Pitbull, "Grammy Family" featuring Kanye West, John Legend and Consequence, and "Born-N-Raised" featuring Pitbull, Trick Daddy and Rick Ross.

Singles
The album's lead single, "Holla at Me" was released on February 28, 2006. The song features guest appearances from Lil Wayne, Paul Wall, Fat Joe, Rick Ross and Pitbull, with the production by Cool & Dre. The song peaked at number 59 on the US Billboard Hot 100.

The album's second single, "Grammy Family" was released on July 1, 2006. The song features guest appearances from both American rappers Kanye West and Consequence, alongside American singer-songwriter John Legend, while West himself also produced the track as well, alongside Jon Brion.

The album's third single, "Born-N-Raised" was released on September 24, 2006. The song features guest appearances from Pitbull and Rick Ross (whom both previously featured on "Holla at Me"), alongside fellow American rapper Trick Daddy, with the production by The Runners. The song also included on Pitbull's second album El Mariel.

Reception

Critical reception

Upon its release, the album received a generally positive reception from music critics. AllMusic's David Jeffries praised Khaled for crafting an album that's diverse in its production geography-wise and for bringing out great performances from his artists. A.L. Friedman of PopMatters also praised Khaled for bringing in an all-star cast of artists and producers, signaling out "Born-N-Raised" and "Gangsta Shit" as the album's highlights. Vibe contributor Damien Scott felt that Khaled "masterfully balances hometown pride with outer regional influences", highlighting "Holla at Me", "Problem" and "Candy Paint" for their production and lyricism, concluding that "[T]his compilation makes a solid sonic case for why it deserves to be heard."
Steve 'Flash' Juon of RapReviews gave a mixed review of the record, saying it was competent and has a few standout tracks but that it didn't reveal much about Khaled besides the fact that he has many connections and shows pride in representing Miami. Andres Tardio of HipHopDX gave credit to the catchy production, but felt it was let down by the weak lyricism delivered by almost every artist throughout the record, concluding that "If nothing else, this album shows off Khaled's connections, but it does little justice to Khaled's talent."

Commercial performance
The album debuted at number 12 on the Billboard 200, selling 44,000 copies in its first week. To date, It has since sold 230,000 copies.

Track listing
Credits adapted from BMI and ASCAP.

Sample Credits

 "Holla at Me" contains a sample of "Looking for the Perfect Beat" written by Arthur Baker, John Robie, Afrika Bambaataa, Robert Allen, John Miller and Eliis Williams and performed by Afrika Bambaataa & The Soulsonic Force.

Personnel

 DJ Khaled                                – production 
 The Runners – production 
 DJ Nasty & LVM                           – production 
 Midnight Black                               – production 
 Kanye West                               – production 
 Jon Brion                                – production 
 Cool & Dre                               – production 
 Streetrunner                                 – production 
 Mr. Collipark                            – production 
 DVLP                                     – production 
 Filthy                                       – production 
 T-Mix                                        – production 
 Keith Mack                                   – production 
 Diaz Brothers                            – production

Charts

References

2006 debut albums
DJ Khaled albums
E1 Music albums
Albums produced by Cool & Dre
Albums produced by Kanye West
Albums produced by Jon Brion
Albums produced by Mr. Collipark
Albums produced by the Runners
Albums produced by DJ Khaled